The simple station Calle 187 is part of the TransMilenio mass-transit system of Bogotá, Colombia, which opened in the year 2000.

Location
The station is located in the north of the city, on the North Highway between 185 and 187 streets. It is accessed by a pedestrian bridge located between these two routes.

Serves the demand of the neighborhoods Mirandela, the Cerezo and its environs.

Close to the station is the Santafé Shopping Center, Mirandela Plaza, Plaza Norte, Autopista 184 and Mirandela Park.

History
Works for the extension of the trunk of the Autopista Norte began in 2009, the year in which the avenue was expanded from 182 to 192. The station opened to the public in January 2012.

On the night of April 9, 2013, attacks against the station were recorded. On that occasion, the stations Calle 100 (TransMilenio), Calle 106 (TransMilenio), Prado (TransMilenio), Alcalá (TransMilenio), Calle 142 (TransMilenio), Calle 146 (TransMilenio), Mazurén (TransMilenio), Calle 161 (TransMilenio), Calle 187 (TransMilenio), and Terminal (TM) with Autopista Norte, were left with $22 million in damages.

Station services

Main line service

Complementary service 
The following complementary routes operate from January 25, 2016:

 circular to the sector of Guaymaral.

 circular to the sector of Germania.

Inter-city service

This station does not have inter-city service.

External links
TransMilenio

See also
Bogotá
TransMilenio
List of TransMilenio Stations

TransMilenio